2008 National League Two was a semi-professional rugby league football competition played in the United Kingdom, the third tier of the sport in the country. The winner of this league was promoted to renamed Championship (formerly National League 1). There is no relegation from this league as it is the lowest tier of professional rugby league in the UK.

National League Two

Table

Playoffs

See also
Rugby League Championships

External links
Rugby Football League

RFL League 1
Rugby Football League Championship
2008 in English rugby league